Pseudogobio banggiangensis is a species of cyprinid endemic to the Yangtze in China.

References

Pseudogobio
Fish described in 2001